Hypostomus papariae is a species of catfish in the family Loricariidae. It is native to South America, where it is believed to occur in the Potenji River basin in the state of Rio Grande do Norte in Brazil. The species reaches 11.4 cm (4.5 inches) in total length and is believed to be a facultative air-breather. The specific epithet papariae likely refers to Lake Papari, which the species is known from, an etymology shared with another loricariid species, Pseudancistrus papariae.

References 

papariae
Taxa named by Henry Weed Fowler
Fish described in 1941
Catfish of South America